Powerdot is a LaTeX class for making professional-looking presentation slides. It can be considered an alternative to the class Beamer.
This class is based on the prosper class and HA-prosper package and was created with the intention to replace prosper and HA-prosper.

References

External links

 powerdot
 tutorial

Free TeX software
Free presentation software
Presentation software
Software using the LPPL license